This article lists the confirmed national football squads for the 2018 SAFF Championship tournament held in Bangladesh, between 4 September and 15 September 2018. The position listed for each player is per the squad list in the official match reports by the SAFF. The age listed for each player is on 4 September 2018, the first day of the tournament. Players may hold more than one non-FIFA nationality. A flag is included for coaches that are of a different nationality than their own national team.

Group A

Bangladesh
Bangladesh announced their squad on 3 September 2018.

Coach:  Jamie Day

Bhutan
Coach:  Trevor Morgan

Nepal
Nepal announced their squad on 27 August 2018.

Coach: Bal Gopal Maharjan

Pakistan
Pakistan announced their squad on 1 September 2018.

Coach:  José Antonio Nogueira

Group B

India
India announced their squad on 4 September 2018.

Coach:  Stephen Constantine

Maldives
Maldives announced their squad on 2 September 2018.

Coach:  Petar Segrt

Sri Lanka
Sri Lanka announced their squad on 24 August 2018.

Coach: Pakir Ali

References

External links
Official Website

2018 SAFF Championship
SAFF Championship squads